The following is an overview of public housing estates on Tsing Yi, Hong Kong including Home Ownership Scheme (HOS), Private Sector Participation Scheme (PSPS), Flat-for-Sale Scheme (FFSS), Tenant Purchase Scheme (TPS) and Subsidised Sale Flats Project (SSFP) estates.

History
At early 1970s, the residents of Tsing Yi Island were largely villagers and fishermen. Later, the government decided to extend the Tsuen Wan New Town westward onto the island. The plan was to develop the northeastern quadrant of the island into residential use, and some estates were to be built on reclaimed land. The Hong Kong Housing Authority was mandated to construct public housing estates as part of this plan. Cheung Ching Estate is the first stage of new town development.

All the estates in this development are named "Cheung variable Estate", and most flats were destined for rental. Tsing Yi Estate is named after Tsing Yi Hui, which was demolished to make way for its construction.

Easeful Court was originally destined for the HOS, but ended up being let due to the impact of SARS.

Overview

Broadview Garden

Broadview Garden is a public housing estate built by Hong Kong Housing Society in Tsing Yi, located near Tsing Yi Estate and Tsing Yi Park.

The estate consists of 7 residential blocks completed in 1991. Its Block 1 to 5 is for Flat-for-Sale Scheme and Block 6–7 is for rent, mainly the residents affected by redevelopment of Bo Shek Mansion in Tsuen Wan.

Cheung Ching Estate
The Chinese characters Cheung Ching, mean "evergreen". The Estate is located on mid-east side of Tsing Yi Island, near Tsing Yi Bridge. It was bounded by Tsing Yi Road, Ching Hong Road, Chung Mei Road, and Tsing Yi Heung Sze Wui Road. 

In June 1977, the first intake of 2146 people were allocated housing in Phase I of the estate (Ching Wai House, Ching Yung House, and Ching Kwai House). They were residents from overcrowded estates, or were relocated from redevelopment of older (Mk I and Mk II blocks) estates in Kowloon Bay, and Hong Kong Island. At the time, transport infrastructure was undeveloped, and there were great concerns about logistics from would-be residents.

Later, Ching Chung House, Ching Pak House, Ching Mui House and Ching Yeung House came on stream. In the early 1980s, Ching Tao House was built for the relocation of residents owing to reclamation of Tsing Yi Tong and Mun Tsai Tong.

To the west are Mayfair Gardens and Cheung Hong Estate, to the north is Chung Mei Lo Uk Village, to the east are industrial building, to the south are Rambler Crest and the Container Terminal 9.

Configuration
The estate consists of eight 'houses', i.e. high-rise blocks of flats, with 4905 flats. There are currently 4700 households in the estate. Other than residential blocks, the estate also provides a commercial centre with market, a community centre, a bus terminus, three primary schools, a secondary school, several car parks and garages, and several playgrounds.

The eight houses of the estate are:

Community facilities
The Cheung Ching Commercial Centre is a 6-storey complex surrounded by Ching Yung House, Ching Wai House and Ching Kwai House. At the podium level, there are a handful of shops and a Chinese restaurant. At the market level, most shops sell fresh food. A supermarket is at the ground floor. A garage is incorporated in the centre. There are two clinics on the ground floor of Ching Wai House. Some NGOs also set up facilities at Ching Yung House and Ching Kwai House.

The Cheung Ching Estate Community Centre is the first community centre on the Tsing Yi Island. It was built in the late phase of the Cheung Ching Estate. The building is of 7 storeys, providing various community services for mainly south part of the new town of Tsing Yi Island. The Community Centre is operated by various NGOs. YWCA operates one integrated centre (for youth, family, female and school), one elderly centre, and a kindergarten. Lutheran provides service for the physical handicapped and the deaf. Yan Chai provides temporary after-school care for children. There is a hall for various programmes on the ground floor. From 1st floor to 6th floor, it was occupied by Hong Kong Youth Women's Club Association. Its branch Tsing Yi Integrated Social Service Centre provides integrated services for youth, family, senior citizen, children and workers. Government also has an office on the 1st floor. After budget cuts on social welfare by Hong Kong Government, many local offices of voluntary organisations in the area were withdrawn or incorporated into the centre.

Cheung Fat Estate

Cheung Fat Estate (Chinese: 長發邨) comprises 4 tower blocks, built on reclaimed land in Tsing Yi North. All buildings, except for King Fat House, enjoy a seaview over Tsuen Wan seashore.

In May 2005, the Government announced the sale of  flats under the final phase of the TPS. Cheung Fat Estate was to be part of this "privatisation" by the Authority, under a scheme in which all "flats" are set for sale by the end of 2006.

Community facilities
Cheung Fat Plaza, a five-storey shopping centre located in the lower part of the estate, caters to the household needs of residents in Cheung Fat and surrounding estates, and was considered one of the most important shopping arcades under the Housing Authority. It is now under the management of The Link REIT, having been spun off from the Authority and listed on the Hong Kong stock market in 2005.

There are a variety of facilities, shops and restaurants which cater for the household needs of residents in Cheung Fat and surrounding estates, namely Cheung On Estate and Ching Wang Court. For example, the Sports Centre on the 4th floor which has facilities for badminton, squash and basketball, as well as fitness room. There is a Cantonese restaurant on the top floor, which is famous for its hot pot buffet. McDonald's and other restaurants can be found there as well. There are two supermarkets, one on the ground floor and another on the third floor. Maritime Market is situated next to the shopping centre.

Cheung Hang Estate
 
Cheung Hang Estate (長亨邨) was built on the hills near Liu To of Tsing Yi Island, Hong Kong. It provides 4689 rental flats and the year of intake was 1990. It is adjacent to Cheung Wang Estate. There is a footpath linking Tsing Yi Nature Trail and Liu To Road near Cheung Hang Shopping Centre. On the trail people can enjoy the beautiful view of Tsing Ma Bridge.

Community facilities
Cheung Hang has a small-scale two-floor shopping centre. A Chinese restaurant, Fairwood Restaurant and a cha chaan teng are there. It is next to the bus terminus. Moreover, a Wellcome Supermarket is situated there as well. Under the shopping centre, there is a market. Both the shopping centre and market serve residents of Cheung Hang Estate, Cheung Wang Estate and Mount Haven. A community hall is situated in the middle of the estate.

Cheung Hong Estate

Cheung Hong Estate (Chinese: 長康邨) is composed of 13 residential blocks, with two commercial centres. Two primary schools and two secondary schools are also in the estate. This is the second estate in the area.

Cheung Hong is a large estate: it reaches Tsing Yi Road West at the west and nearly Cheung Ching Bus Terminus at the east.

Cheung On Estate

Cheung On Estate (Chinese: 長安邨) is situated in Area 8 of Tsing Yi Island, built on the reclaimed land in Tsing Yi North. The estate consists of ten high-rise blocks of flats. Among 7338 flats in the estate, 5617 flats have been sold to the residents under the TPS since January 1998. Cheung On Estate was the one of the first few estates to be sold under the above scheme. The remaining 1721 flats are remained as the public housing, which 1600 households are living in. According to the census taken in 2001, the total population of the estate is 28,278.

The ten blocks in the estate consist of three building types: Linear 1, New Slab and Trident 3. They are:

Cheung Wang Estate
Cheung Wang Estate (長宏邨) is situated in Liu To on Tsing Yi Island, Hong Kong. It was built on the hilly site of Tsing Yan Temporary Housing Area (青欣臨時房屋區) after the temporary houses were demolished. The estate consists of seven high-rise blocks of flats, with 4273 flats.

Ching Chun Court 

Ching Chun Court is a HOS court in Ching Hong Road, Tsing Yi South, near Cheung Ching Estate and Cheung Hong Estate. It comprises two 26-storey blocks with total of 465 flats. The flat size ranges from 420 to 440 square feet sold at an amount from HK$2.2M to HK$2.7M. It was completed in 2017.

Chun Ho House was sealed for covid-test on 28 February 2022.

Ching Fu Court 

Ching Fu Court (Chinese: 青富苑) is a HOS court under Green Form Subsidised Home Ownership Scheme in Tsing Yi South between Rambler Crest and Mayfair Garden. Flat size ranges from 187 to 471 square foot and will be sold at less than 50 percent of market price from HK$820,000 to HK$2.73 million.

Ching Nga Court 
Ching Nga Court (Chinese: 青雅苑) is a HOS court in Tsing Yi North, located at the east of Cheung Fat Estate. It has only one block built in 1989.

Ching Shing Court 

Ching Shing Court (Chinese: 青盛苑) is the first HOS court in Tsing Yi, near Hong Fung House, Cheung Hong Estate. It is a block designated for HOS during the development of public housing estate Cheung Hong Estate. It looks like the integral part of the estate. It has only block built in 1985.

Ching Tai Court 

Ching Tai Court (Chinese: 青泰苑) is a HOS court in Tsing Yi North, located at the west of Cheung Fat Estate. It has 7 blocks built in 1988.

Ching Wah Court 

Ching Wah Court (Chinese: 青華苑) is a HOS court in Tsing Yi, situated on the hills opposite to Cheung Hong Estate Phase 2. It has totally 6 blocks built in 1986. It is unlike the first Home Ownership Scheme estate, Ching Shing Court, which was the first one completely designed to be a standalone comparable to other private housing estates on the island.

Ching Wang Court

Ching Wang Court is a HOS in Tsing Yi, near Cheung On Estate, Cheung Fat Estate and Villa Esplanada. Formerly the site of Ching Fat Temporary Housing Area, it consists of 2 residential buildings completed in 2001.

Easeful Court

Easeful Court is a public housing estate in Tsing Yi Island, New Territories, Hong Kong. It is located near Delia (Man Kiu) English Primary School, Tsing Yi North Coastal Road and Cheung On Estate and within walking distance to MTR Tsing Yi station. It consists of two residential blocks completed in 2003, with a total of 510 rental units. It was supposed to be sold under HOS, but was changed to rental after policy change of Hong Kong Government at the time of a property slump to stabilise the property prices in wake of the SARS epidemic.

Easeful Court is located in On Ho constituency of the Kwai Tsing District Council. It was formerly represented by Warren Tam Ka-chun, who was elected in the 2019 elections until July 2021.

Greenview Villa

Greenview Villa (Chinese: 綠悠雅苑) is the first Subsidized Sale Flats Project court developed by the Hong Kong Housing Society in Tsing Luk Street, Tsing Yi. It consists of three 38-storey residential towers providing 988 residential units on a 2-storey podium with landscape garden, car park and recreational facilities, with an extensive on-grade landscape garden. The flats were sold in 2012 to individuals with a monthly income of HK$25,000 or less, and to households with a monthly income of HK$40,000 or less and they were priced from HK$5,841 to HK$7,402 per sq ft in terms of saleable area - a 30 per cent market discount. It completed in 2015.

Serene Garden

Serene Garden (Chinese: 海悅花園) is a HOS and PSPS court in Tsing Yi, located at the reclaimed land of Tsing Yi Bay. It is near Tsing Yi Park, Tsing Yi Pier, Greenfield Garden and Tivoli Garden. It has three blocks built in 1992.

Tivoli Garden 

Tivoli Garden (Chinese: 宏福花園) is a housing estate in Tsing Yi, New Territories, developed by the Hong Kong Housing Society in 1995. It was the Society's first development under the Sandwich Class Housing Scheme.

It is located at 75 Tsing King Road, between Serene Garden and Tsing Yi Sports Ground. It takes its name from the town of Tivoli in the Lazio region of central Italy.

Tivoli Garden comprises four blocks and a total of 1,024 apartments, with sizes ranging from 635 to 832 sq. ft.

The project was completed with three months delay, and a contractor was fined as a consequence. After completion, about 1,900 complaints related to the buildings quality were directed by tenants to the Hong Kong Housing Society in July 1996. The society later announced that it had apologised to the residents and that most defects had been repaired.

Tsing Yi Estate

Tsing Yi Estate (Chinese: 青衣邨) is the only public housing estate on Tsing Yi Island which name does not start with the character Cheung (長). This is due to the fact that the estate was named in the memory of Tsing Yi Town (青衣墟), a traditional market town which was demolished in the 1980s to make way for new town developments. Since the estate was situated at the seaside of old Tsing Yi Town, part of it is built on reclaimed land. The estate consists of four high-rise blocks of flats.

The four residential blocks are:

Gallery

References

External links

Housing Authority website

 
 
 
 
 
 
Tsing Yi